Kanya Thiensawang (born 8 August 1914 in Nonthaburi, Thailand), nicknamed Lucille was the first winner of the Miss Siam pageant (now known as Miss Thailand), in 1934. Her mother was of Mon descent and she died when Kanya was 10 years old.

References 
 ย้อนตำนานนางสาวไทย
 รายนามนางสาวไทยและรองนางสาวไทย 
 กันยา เทียนสว่าง - นางสาวสยาม ๒๔๗๗

Kanya Thiensawang
Kanya Thiensawang
1914 births
1960 deaths